The Mamalilikala (Mamalelequala, Mamalilikulla, Mamalillaculla, Mamaleleqala) are an indigenous nation, a part of the Kwakwaka'wakw, in central British Columbia, on northern Vancouver Island.  Their main village was Memkumlis ('Mimkwamlis), located on Village Island.  Their Indian Act band government is the Mamalilikulla-Qwe'Qwa'Sot'Em First Nation.

See also 
 Kwakwaka'wakw

External links 
 U'mista Cultural Society - Alert Bay

Mamalilikala